Selections from Irving Berlin's White Christmas is an album with songs from the 1954 movie, White Christmas. Among the featured artists are Bing Crosby, Rosemary Clooney, Danny Kaye, and Trudy Stevens (who dubbed for Vera-Ellen in the movie), with Peggy Lee, who was not in the movie, singing some parts. It is one of the last 78 rpm albums Decca produced.

Background
An original soundtrack recording has never been released. This was because Crosby had a recording contract with Decca Records and Rosemary Clooney was signed with Columbia Records and contractually could not record together. This album was issued with Columbia's Irving Berlin's White Christmas. In this album, Lee recorded the parts that Clooney sang in the movie. This was Crosby's third Decca LP album, recorded and released in 1954 and advertised as the soundtrack for White Christmas.

For the 78rpm set, the three song medley "Blue Skies/I'd Rather See a Minstrel Show/Mandy" running to 3 minutes 53 seconds was a  too long for a 10" 78, so "Blue Skies" was removed.

The music and lyrics were written by highly celebrated songwriter Irving Berlin. The album was released on CD by MCA in 1994. In the UK, it was released in 2002 as part of a 2-on-1 CD with studio recordings of songs from Holiday Inn (1942). A special edition, combined with the DVD of the film, was sold in Starbucks stores during the holiday season in 2006.

Although Clooney and Crosby were unable to make an album together at this time, they made the albums Fancy Meeting You Here, How the West Was Won , and That Travelin' Two-Beat later in their careers. They also co-starred in a network radio show and frequently appeared together on television during the 1950s and 1960s.

Many reissues of the song "Sisters" incorrectly attribute the performance to both Lee and Stevens when both parts are sung by Lee using overdubbing.

 Variety said, "Another sock talent parlay adds up to another click pic score package."

Track listing

Personnel
 Bing Crosby – vocals
 Danny Kaye – vocals
 Peggy Lee – vocals
 Trudy Stevens – vocals
 The Skylarks – vocals
 Joseph Lilley – arranger, conductor

References

Bing Crosby albums
Peggy Lee albums
1954 Christmas albums
Christmas albums by American artists
Collaborative albums
Danny Kaye albums
Irving Berlin tribute albums

hr:Bijeli Božić (pjesma)